Admiral Sir Charles John Briggs  (15 July 1858 – 16 July 1951) was a Royal Navy officer who went on to be Third Sea Lord and Controller of the Navy.

Naval career
Briggs joined the Royal Navy as a cadet in 1872. He was promoted to the rank of Captain on 22 June 1897, and appointed in command of the torpedo boat depot ship HMS Vulcan on 12 December 1901.

He was appointed Rear Admiral in the First Division of the Home Fleet in 1909 before becoming Third Sea Lord and Controller of the Navy in 1910 and then being given command of the 4th Battle Squadron in the Home Fleet in 1913. He retired in 1917.

Family
In 1901 he married Frances Mary Wilson; they had three sons and three daughters.

References

External links
 Charles John Briggs at The Dreadnought Project

1858 births
1951 deaths
Royal Navy admirals of World War I
Knights Commander of the Order of the Bath
Lords of the Admiralty
People from Brentford
Military personnel from Essex